Menabe is a region in western Madagascar, with its capital at Morondava. The population mostly belongs to the Sakalava ethnic group. The region is named after the 18th-century Sakalava Kingdom of Menabe (16th-18th centuries). The name "Menabe", in turn, means "big red", after the color of laterite rock that dominates the landscape.

History
Menabe is the southern part of the Sakalava territory. Tradition holds that it was founded by Adriamandazoala (reigned c1540 - 1560). Its territory was increased under the legendary Andriandahifotsy (c1610 - 1685). It thus became the strongest kingdom in Madagascar until the mid-18th century. Among its most famous rulers was Ranaimo or Andriandrainarivo (ruled 1718-1727) who is known through the memoirs of Europeans such as Robert Drury, James Cook, the crew of the Dutch East Indiaman Barneveld, 1719, François Valentijn (1726).  Though handsome and imposing he was a paralytic.

Radama I would conduct three ravaging campaigns in the kingdom of Menabe in 1820, in 1821 and finally in 1822. Finally, Ramitraho king of Menabe at the time, sued for peace by giving his daughter Rasalimo to Radama as his wife. But peace would not follow until Rasalimo offered another peace treaty in 1827. Unfortunately Radama died before negotiations could finish.

Eventually the Merina conquered and subjugated the southern Menabe territories in 1834 right after Ramitraho's death. Constant war would ensue culminating with a Merina victory in 1846. Queen Ranavalona I then garrisoned major Menabe towns and sent farmers to colonize the area. Menabe rulers were allowed to keep their authority but under the local Merina governor. The northern Menabe largely escaped Merina authority and stayed independent despite the fact that they no longer posed any threat to the monarchy in Antananarivo.

During the French invasion of Madagascar the Menabe kings united their forces. On August 14, 1897 and August 30, 1897 the 100 Menabe chiefs with 10,000 warriors armed with rifles met the French troops in Anosimena and Ambiky. King Itoera was killed along with both his generals and many of his nobles. But the Menabe was not pacified until the year 1900.

Menabe was then incorporated into the province of Toliara under the French colonization which ended in 1960.  In 2004 it became a Region.

Geography
The Menabe region is situated between the Mangoky and Manambolo Rivers.

Rivers
Mangoky
Manambolo River
Morondava River
Tsiribihina River
Sakeny River

Tourism
The Avenue of the Baobabs is one of the most visited locations in the region.

Transport
It is connected with the inland by the Route nationale No.35 to Ivato, Route nationale No.34 to Antsirabe and is crossed by the Route nationale No.8 to Bekopaka.

Airports
Ankavandra Airport
Belo/Tsiribihina Airport
Malaimbandy Airport
Mandabe Airport
Manja Airport
Miandrivazo Airport
Morondava Airport

Protected Areas
Part of Mangoky Ihotry Wetland Complex
Ambondrobe New Protected Area
Avenue of the Baobabs New Protected Area
Menabe Antimena New Protected Area
Part of the Ambohijanahary Reserve
Kirindy Mitea National Park
Andranomena Reserve
are situated in this region.

Administrative divisions
Menabe Region is divided into five districts, which are sub-divided into 51 communes:

 Belo sur Tsiribihina District - 14 communes
 Mahabo District - 11 communes
 Manja District - 6 communes
 Miandrivazo District - 15 communes
 Morondava District - 5 communes

References

External links
 Among the Menabe; or, Thirteen Months on the West Coast of Madagascar. By George Herbert Smith, S.P.G. Missionary (1896)
 Menabe flag and key dates
 Menabe tourism office

 
Regions of Madagascar